Lieutenant Commander (often abbreviated Lt Cdr) is a senior officer rank in the Royal Navy of the United Kingdom. It is immediately junior to commander and immediately senior to the naval rank of lieutenant.

The equivalent rank in the British Army and Royal Marines is major; and in the Royal Air Force, it is squadron leader.

History
Originally having fewer officer ranks than the Army, the Navy previously split some of its ranks by seniority (time in rank) to provide equivalence: hence a lieutenant with fewer than eight years seniority wore two stripes and ranked with an army captain; a lieutenant of eight years or more wore two stripes with a thinner one in between, and ranked with a major. This distinction was abolished when the rank of lieutenant commander was introduced in March 1914, although promotion to that rank remained automatic following eight years seniority in the rank of lieutenant. Automatic promotion was stopped with the introduction of ‘Pay2000’ and promotion is now only awarded on merit.

Insignia
The insignia worn by a Royal Navy lieutenant commander is two medium gold braid stripes with one thin gold stripe running in between, placed upon a navy blue 
background. The top stripe has the ubiquitous loop used in all RN officer rank insignia, except for the rank of Midshipman. The RAF follows this pattern with its equivalent rank of squadron leader.

Royal Observer Corps
Throughout much of its existence, the British Royal Observer Corps (ROC) maintained a rank of observer lieutenant commander.  The ROC wore a Royal Air Force uniform and their rank insignia appeared similar to that of an RAF squadron leader except that the stripes were shown entirely in black. Prior to the renaming, the rank had been known as observer lieutenant (first class).

See also

 British and U.S. military ranks compared
 Comparative military ranks
 Royal Navy officer rank insignia

External links
The Dreadnought Project - Lieutenant-Commander

Military ranks of the Royal Navy
1914 introductions